Mark Sebastian Wainwright is an Australian chemical engineer and emeritus professor of the University of New South Wales, and institutional leader within the Australian academic and technological sectors. He served as seventh vice chancellor and president of the UNSW from 2004 to 2006. In 2004 he was appointed a member of the Order of Australia for services to chemical engineering as a researcher and academic, and to tertiary education. In 2007 he was awarded an honorary doctorate of science by the University of New South Wales. He was born 20 Oct.,1943.

Education 
Wainwright obtained BAppSc degrees in Applied Chemistry and in Applied Science from the University of Adelaide/South Australia Institute of Technology in 1966 and 1967, respectively. His postgraduate degrees include MAppSc in Chemical Engineering from the University of Adelaide in 1969, PhD in Chemical Engineering from McMaster University (Hamilton, Ontario, Canada) in 1974, and a DSc by research from the University of South Australia in 2003.

Career 
Wainwright began a teaching career as a tutor demonstrator while being a part-time graduate student at SAIT (1967–1969), and McMaster University. Once a doctor in 1974, he became a faculty member at the University of New South Wales, where he remained continuously until his retirement from the institution in 2006. His career at UNSW included successive positions as lecturer in industrial chemistry at the School of Chemical Technology (1977–1980), associate professor (1981–1988), professor/departmental head of chemical engineering (1989–1991), dean of the faculty of engineering (1991–2000), pro-vice-chancellor (1998–2000), deputy vice chancellor, vice chancellor, and president (2004–2006).

His research fields have included studies on applied catalysis, reaction engineering, mineral processing, adsorption processes in pollution abatement and gas and liquid chromatography. His research papers are often cited by reference books on organic reaction catalysis, solid catalysts, and heterogeneous catalysis.

As an institutional leader, he Chaired of the National Computational Infrastructure Advisory Board from 2007 to 2015.

Membership 
Wainwright's activities in higher education span more than 40 years. Positions he held include:

 Chair, Australia-China Council (DFAT, 2006 – 2011)
 Director, Astronomy Australia Limited (2009 – 2012)
 Member and Chair, National Institute for Experimental Arts Advisory Committee (2010 – 2014) 
 Member of Convenor, Hong Kong Research Assessment Exercise (2011 – 2014)
 Founding Chairman, Foundation for Australian Studies in China (2010 – 2015)
 Member, ACOLA Working Group on Asian Literacy (2012 – 2015)
 Member, Hong Kong University Grants Committee (2011 – 2017) 
 Chair, TAFE New South Wales Higher Education Governing Council (2009 – 2018)
 International Academic Review Panel, Singapore Management University (2014 – 2018).
 Chair, Sydney School of Entrepreneurship Board (2016 – 2019)
 Chair, Intersect Australia Limited (2008 – 2020)
Member of International Advisory Board, Hong Kong Polytechnic University (2010 - 2019)
 Chair, Australian Genomic Cancer Medicine Centre Board (2018 – 2020)
 Independent Director, Australia's Academic and Research Network (AARNet) Pty Ltd Board (2010 – Present)

Works 
Some of Wainwright's most cited scientific articles are:

 Jiang, C. J.; Trimm, D. L.; Wainwright, M. S.; Cant, N. W. (1993-04-23). "Kinetic mechanism for the reaction between methanol and water over a Cu-ZnO-Al2O3 catalyst". Applied Catalysis A: General. 97 (2): 145–158. doi:10.1016/0926-860X(93)80081-Z. ISSN 0926-860X
 Jiang, C. J.; Trimm, D. L.; Wainwright, M. S.; Cant, N. W. (1993-01-04). "Kinetic study of steam reforming of methanol over copper-based catalysts". Applied Catalysis A: General. 93 (2): 245–255. doi:10.1016/0926-860X(93)85197-W. ISSN 0926-860X
 Evans, J. W.; Wainwright, M. S.; Bridgewater, A. J.; Young, D. J. (1983-07-15). "On the determination of copper surface area by reaction with nitrous oxide". Applied Catalysis. 7 (1): 75–83. doi:10.1016/0166-9834(83)80239-5. ISSN 0166-9834
 Wainwright, Mark S.; Foster, Neil R. (1979-01-01). "Catalysts, Kinetics and Reactor Design in Phthalic Anhydride Synthesis". Catalysis Reviews. 19 (2): 211–292. doi:10.1080/03602457908068056. ISSN 0161-4940

Awards 

 1987 - Royal Australian Chemical Institute Applied Research Award – Erich Heymann Medal, with D.L. Trimm and N.W. Cant for research into copper catalysts and catalytic processes based on copper
 1989 - Royal Australian Chemical Institute R.K. Murphy Medal for applied research in reaction engineering and minerals processing
 1995 - Fellowship from the National Institute of Resources and the Environment (NIRE) for Raney Copper-Zinc Methanol Synthesis Research – Japan
 1996 - Murray Raney Award of the Organic Reaction Catalysis Society – for Research into Raney Catalysts – Atlanta
 2000 - Awarded Centenary Medal for service to Australian society in research policy and management and engineering education
 2004 - Awarded Member of the Order of Australia (AM) for service to chemical engineering as a researcher and academic, and to tertiary education
 2004 - Awarded Doctor of Science (honouris causa) by the University of New South Wales
 2010 - Honorific naming of UNSW Mark Wainwright Analytical Centre
 2012 - Awarded an Honorary Doctorate of Chemical Engineering by Mahanakorn University of Technology, Thailand

References

External links 
Vice-Chancellors Exhibition, University of New South Wales.
Publications of Prof Mark Wainwright

Members of the Order of Australia
McMaster University alumni
Living people
1943 births
Vice-Chancellors of the University of New South Wales
Fellows of the Australian Academy of Technological Sciences and Engineering
Vice Chancellors of the University of Wollongong
University of Adelaide alumni
Academic staff of the University of Adelaide
Academic staff of McMaster University
Hong Kong Polytechnic University people
TAFE NSW
Australian chemical engineers